Erik Sven Gunnar Karlsson (born 31 May 1990) is a Swedish professional ice hockey defenceman and alternate captain for the San Jose Sharks of the National Hockey League (NHL). Karlsson was drafted in the first round, 15th overall, by the Ottawa Senators at the 2008 NHL Entry Draft, with whom he spent his first nine NHL seasons. Karlsson is a two-time winner of the James Norris Memorial Trophy as the NHL's best defenceman, winning the award in 2012 and 2015.

Playing career

Sweden

Karlsson made his Elitserien debut for Frölunda HC on 1 March 2008, recording 8:48 of ice time during a sold out home game in Scandinavium against league leaders HV71. Karlsson scored the game-winning goal, assisted by Tomi Kallio and Magnus Kahnberg, with a slap shot in overtime during a man advantage. The win secured a playoff berth for Frölunda with three games remaining in the regular season.

Karlsson finished the season with Frölunda's J20 team playing in the J20 SuperElit playoffs, where Frölunda took home the Anton Cup when they won, two games to one, against Brynäs IF's J20 team in the Swedish Junior Ice Hockey Championship final.

Ottawa Senators
Prior to the 2008 NHL Entry Draft, Karlsson was ranked fourth among European skaters by the NHL's Central Scouting Service. He was ultimately drafted 15th overall by the Ottawa Senators in front of their hometown fans at Scotiabank Place in Ottawa. The selection was made by Ottawa's captain Daniel Alfredsson, a native of Gothenburg, who played for Frölunda before entering the NHL. Then-Ottawa general manager Bryan Murray traded Ottawa's first-round pick, 18th overall, and their third-round pick in 2009 to the Nashville Predators in exchange for the Predators' first-round pick, 15th overall, to ensure that no other team would select Karlsson before them.

A few weeks before the 2008–09 Elitserien season premiere, Frölunda announced that Karlsson was brought up to the senior team as a regular roster player.

In September 2009, Karlsson attended the Senators' training camp ahead of the 2009–10 season. On 29 September 2009, the Senators announced that Karlsson had made the team's NHL roster. After struggling in nine regular season games with Ottawa, he was assigned to the team's American Hockey League (AHL) affiliate, the Binghamton Senators. On 27 November 2009, exactly one month after being sent down, Karlsson was recalled from Binghamton. He would score his first NHL goal against the Minnesota Wild's Niklas Bäckström in a 4–1 win for Ottawa on 19 December 2009, and would remain in the NHL for the remainder of the season and play in all of Ottawa's 2010 Stanley Cup playoff games.

Karlsson was selected to participate in the 2011 NHL All-Star Game, set for 30 January 2011, at the RBC Center in Raleigh, North Carolina, having recorded 25 points in 41 games.

The 2011–12 season saw Karlsson continue his development. On 16 December 2011, with his third assist of the night, Karlsson registered his 100th regular-season NHL point (in 168 games) in a game against the rival Pittsburgh Penguins. Karlsson was the NHL's leading vote-getter in All-Star voting, receiving 939,951 fan votes and becoming one of four Senators players selected to partake in the 2012 NHL All-Star Game. Karlsson finished the season as the leading scorer among NHL defencemen, leading second-place Dustin Byfuglien and Brian Campbell by 25 points. Karlsson was being mentioned as a James Norris Memorial Trophy candidate, if not the favourite for the award.

On 19 June 2012, Karlsson signed a reported seven-year, $45.5 million contract with the Senators. The following day, Karlsson was announced as the winner of the James Norris Trophy as the NHL's best defenceman, beating Zdeno Chára of the Boston Bruins and Shea Weber of the Nashville Predators. He became the second Swede after seven-time winner Nicklas Lidström to win the award, joining the ranks of Hall of Famers Bobby Orr and Denis Potvin as the only players to win the award under age 23.

During the 2012–13 NHL lockout, Karlsson signed with Jokerit of the Finnish SM-liiga. He received a one-game suspension for allegedly throwing his stick at a referee following a game on 8 December 2012. He finished his stint in Jokerit with 9 goals and 25 assists (34 points) in 30 games, leading all defencemen in scoring. Once the lockout ended and the NHL season commenced, Karlsson promptly recorded a goal and two assists as Ottawa defeated the Winnipeg Jets 4–1 in their season opener. On 13 February 2013, Karlsson's Achilles tendon was lacerated when Pittsburgh Penguins forward Matt Cooke had his skate land on the back of Karlsson's left leg, requiring surgery and taking him out of Ottawa's lineup indefinitely. Cooke had been suspended several times previously for much-criticized incidents resulting in injury to opposing players, but was not suspended for this incident. At the time of the injury, Karlsson led all NHL defencemen with six goals. Though initial estimates had him out of the lineup for four-to-six months, Karlsson returned to the Ottawa lineup against the Washington Capitals on 25 April 2013, ten weeks to the day after the injury occurred. The Senators made the 2013 Stanley Cup playoffs but were eliminated by Pittsburgh in the Eastern Conference Semifinal, with Karlsson registering one goal and seven assists in ten games.

Karlsson appeared in all 82 games during the 2013–14 season and finished the season with 20 goals and 74 points, resulting in Karlsson being the first defenceman since Brian Leetch in 2000–01 to have at least 20 goals and 50 assists in the same season. However, the Senators would fail to qualify for the 2014 playoffs.

On 2 October 2014, the Senators organization announced that Karlsson would serve as the ninth captain in the team's modern history, replacing the recently-traded Jason Spezza. In his first season as team captain, Karlsson led all NHL defencemen in points for the third time in four seasons, including a career-high 21 goals. He also played in all 82 of Ottawa's games for the second season in a row and ranked third in the NHL in total ice time (2,234:55) and average ice time (27:15) to carry the Senators to a 23–4–4 record on the way to an unlikely playoff spot. On 24 June 2015, it was announced Karlsson won his second Norris Trophy, beating out fellow nominees Drew Doughty and P. K. Subban.

Karlsson appeared in all 82 games for the third-straight season during the 2015–16 season and led the league in assists with a career high 66 assists and set a career high in points (82), finishing fourth in the league in scoring alongside San Jose Sharks forward Joe Thornton. With his 81st point, Karlsson broke the record for most points in a single season by a Swedish defenceman, which was previously set by Nicklas Lidström during the 2005–06 season. Karlsson was also the first defenceman since Paul Coffey in the 1985–86 season to finish in the top five in scoring and the first since Bobby Orr in the 1974–75 season to lead the league in assists. Karlsson's performance earned him his third Norris Trophy nomination, though Drew Doughty won the trophy with Karlsson finishing in second place in vote totals.

During the 2016–17 season, Karlsson set a Senators record on 4 March 2017 when he appeared in his 312th consecutive game, breaking the previous set by defenceman Chris Phillips. However, he would miss his first game in almost four years in late March 2017 after sustaining an injury from blocking a shot during a game against the Philadelphia Flyers, ending his consecutive game streak at 324 games. Karlsson finished the regular season in third place among defencemen in points and second place among defencemen in assists and blocked shots, earning him his fourth Norris Trophy nomination. Karlsson would finish second in voting, with the award going to Brent Burns. Karlsson's performance continued into the 2017 playoffs, helping the Senators reach the Eastern Conference Final, the first time the team had done so since 2007. Although the Senators would be eliminated by the Pittsburgh Penguins in seven games, Karlsson was praised for his performance during the Senators' playoff run and how he continued playing despite suffering two hairline fractures in his left heel. Karlsson would also set a playoff team record for most assists and points for a defenceman in the playoffs. And despite being eliminated in the Eastern Conference Final, Karlsson received a Conn Smythe Trophy vote without playing a game in the Stanley Cup Final. 

Shortly after the Senators were eliminated from the playoffs, Karlsson had surgery to repair torn tendons in his left foot, resulting in him missing the beginning of the 2017–18 season. Karlsson's productivity dwindled in this season, finishing the season with 62 points in 71 games, partly due to coping with injuries and the loss of his child towards the end of the season. Despite his lower-than-average performance, Karlsson moved into third place on the franchise's all-time points list (with 492 points) on 8 February 2018 after a 4–3 win over the Nashville Predators. The Senators also struggled during the season, finishing the season in 30th place in the league. In the midst of a rebuild, the Senators attempted to trade Karlsson before the NHL trade deadline, as his seven-year contract was ending in 2019 and the organization was uncertain about re-signing him, though a deal could not be reached before the deadline. However, the day after the deadline, Karlsson expressed his interest in staying in Ottawa and said that he never requested a trade.

San Jose Sharks
On 13 September 2018, Karlsson (along with Francis Perron) was traded to the San Jose Sharks in exchange for Chris Tierney, Dylan DeMelo, Josh Norris, Rūdolfs Balcers, the Sharks' first-round pick in 2020, second-round pick in 2019 and a conditional second-round pick in 2021. He scored his first goal with the Sharks on 18 November in a 4–0 win over the St. Louis Blues. After a slow start to the season, Karlsson became the fifth defenceman in league history to have at least one assist in 14 consecutive games following a 7–2 victory over the Edmonton Oilers on 8 January 2019. On 23 December, Karlsson was suspended for the first time in his career for two games for an illegal check to the head of Los Angeles Kings player Austin Wagner. A groin injury resulted in Karlsson missing many games near the end of the season before returning for the last game of the season against the Colorado Avalanche. He would finish the season with 45 points in 53 games, his lowest point tally since the 2012–13 season. Karlsson assisted San Jose in reaching the Western Conference Finals during the 2019 playoffs, though he sustained another groin injury in a game against the St. Louis Blues, resulting in him missing San Jose's final game of the playoffs when the team lost 5–1 in Game 6. He would finish the playoffs with 16 points in 19 games. On 31 May, he underwent groin surgery.

On 17 June 2019, Karlsson signed a new eight-year, $92 million contract to remain with the Sharks, with an annual value of $11.5 million. His new contract made Karlsson the highest-paid defenceman in league history and the third highest-paid player in the league at the time, behind Auston Matthews ($11.6 million annually) and Connor McDavid ($12.5 million annually). He broke his thumb on 14 February 2020, in a game against the Winnipeg Jets. He was placed on injured reserve and would miss the remainder of the 2019–20 season.

During the 2022–23 NHL season Karlsson scored his first NHL career hat-trick on 1 November 2022 in a 6–5 shootout loss to the Anaheim Ducks. By 3 February he was leading all defencemen in points, having accumulated 66 by that time, and was among the leading candidates for the Norris Trophy.

Style of play

Karlsson's performance has been widely acclaimed by current and former ice hockey players, head coaches and the media. He is well known for his speed, such as his ability to lead a rush and be the first man to return to defend, and for making plays. In 2012, Bobby Orr praised Karlsson for his fast skating and performance, comparing him to former defencemen such as Larry Robinson and Paul Coffey, while Coffey himself praised Karlsson as an "elite player" and one of the best players in the NHL. Ken Hitchcock praised Karlsson for his skating skill and reading of plays, saying that he is "ahead of the curve everywhere". Henrik Lundqvist also called Karlsson "one of the best players in the game", complimenting his skating skills and vision of the game. Despite his performance, he has also been criticized for not playing a more defensive role as a defenceman.

Karlsson is known as being a more offensive defenceman. He has earned more than 70 points in four different seasons and is the second defenceman in league history to lead his team in scoring in four consecutive campaigns.

Karlsson has also shown his grit and toughness as he has played in numerous games and playoff series with very noticeable injuries. In the Ottawa Senators playoff run in 2017, Karlsson was reported to have played on a broken heel, for which he had to get a surgery the following off-season. Karlsson also rushed himself back from a groin injury in the 2019 NHL playoffs to help with the San Jose Sharks playoff run, which also ended in the conference final series. Karlsson is recognized for using snus, a Swedish form of dipping tobacco, during the games.

International play

Karlsson was selected as the tournament's best defenceman at the 2008 IIHF World U18 Championships. He was the tournament's plus/minus leader with a plus eight rating. He led team Sweden in assists, finishing third overall in the tournament with seven in six games, which also tied him for first place in defencemen scoring. During the 2008 U20 4-Nations tournament which Sweden won, Karlsson scored one goal and one assist which tied him with David Rundblad, Viktor Ekbom and Tim Erixon as Sweden's defenceman scoring leader. At the 2009 World Junior Ice Hockey Championships, Karlsson was selected to the all-star team, and as the tournament's best defenceman. With two goals and seven assists in six games, he led all Swedish players in points, and was tied for the tournament lead among defencemen.

Karlsson played at the 2010 World Championships and was the highest scoring defenceman for Sweden with one goal and three assists in nine games.

Karlsson tied for fourth in team scoring with Senators teammate Daniel Alfredsson at the 2012 World Championship with seven points and led all Swedish defencemen in that category. He also finished tied for fifth in points and tied third in goals by defencemen overall in the tournament.

At the 2014 Olympic Tournament held in Sochi, Karlsson led all players with eight points and was tied for second in goals. On 21 February 2014, Karlsson's scored a powerplay goal in the semi-final against Finland to earn Sweden a spot in the gold medal final against Canada. The Swedes would later lose 3–0. Along with a silver medal, Karlsson was named the Best Defenceman of the tournament and was selected to the All-Star team.

Karlsson declined an invitation to play for Sweden at the 2015 World Championship due to an undisclosed injury.

On 1 March 2016, Karlsson was announced to represent Sweden at the 2016 World Cup of Hockey. In September, he was named alternate captain alongside Daniel Sedin.

Personal life
Karlsson and his first wife, Therese, were divorced in 2013. He married his second wife, Melinda Currey, in Ottawa in August 2017. On November 22 2017, Karlsson and Currey announced via Instagram that they were expecting their first child, and on December 18, they revealed it was a boy. On March 20 2018, the Karlssons announced that their son was stillborn. On October 3 2019, Karlsson and Melinda announced the birth of a daughter.

On June 12 2018, Karlsson's wife filed a protection order against Monika Caryk, girlfriend of Senators' teammate Mike Hoffman, for harassment both before and after the passing of their son. The nature of the alleged harassment included using fake accounts to direct over 1,000 malicious comments towards the Karlssons, including some made regarding the stillbirth of the Karlssons' son. The situation would soon result in legal action against Caryk and the trades of both Karlsson and Hoffman from the Senators' organization.

During a 2018 court deposition, Caryk burst into tears and threatened to leave the room during questioning. She told the court that she and Melinda Karlsson began as friends and that the Karlssons were never outwardly hostile towards her. When asked how the friendship deteriorated, Caryk stated that she became offended after her Facebook and Instagram posts stopped receiving "likes" from Melinda Karlsson, and Caryk became more upset when she stopped receiving invitations to team dinners organized for wives and girlfriends of Senators' players. The deposition revealed that wives and girlfriends of several players associated with the Senators and other organizations had contacted Caryk privately before the matter went public, admonishing her for her continued and increasing hostility towards the Karlssons.

Later that year, Karlsson and his wife organized the charity "Can't Dim My Light" to raise funds and awareness about bullying in schools.

Karlsson's childhood idols included Nicklas Lidström, Daniel Alfredsson, Mats Sundin and Peter Forsberg. He is a supporter of English Premier League football club Arsenal.

Career statistics

Regular season and playoffs
Bold indicates led league

International

Awards

International

NHL

Records and achievements

Milestones
 Drafted 15th overall in the 2008 NHL Draft by the Ottawa Senators.
 Played his first NHL regular season game on 3 October 2009, against the New York Rangers, and also recorded his first NHL point, an assist.
 Scored his first NHL goal on 19 December 2009, against Niklas Bäckström of the Minnesota Wild.
 Silver medal at 2014 Sochi Olympics.
 Led all defencemen at the 2014 Sochi Olympics in points, tied for first among the tournament with Phil Kessel.
 Named the IIHF Best Defenceman at the 2014 Sochi Olympics.

Records
 In 2011–12, Karlsson set a new Senators' franchise record for points in a season by a defenceman (previously held by Norm Maciver) with 78. In 2013–14, he passed Steve Duchesne for the Senators franchise record for most goals in a season by a defenceman with 20. In 2015–16, he once again set a new Senators record for points by a defenceman in a single season with 82, surpassing his previous record at 78.
 In 2015–16, Karlsson set a new Swedish record for most points in a single season by a Swedish defenceman with 82, previously held by Nicklas Lidström
 In the 2017 Stanley Cup playoffs, Karlsson set a Senators franchise record for most assists and points for a defenceman in the post-season (16 assists, 18 points), breaking the previous record set by Wade Redden in the 2006 Stanley Cup playoffs (8 assists, 10 points).
 In 2018–19 Karlsson's first season with the Sharks he set a franchise record for most consecutive games with a point with 14.

References

External links
 

1990 births
Borås HC players
Binghamton Senators players
Frölunda HC players
Ice hockey players at the 2014 Winter Olympics
James Norris Memorial Trophy winners
Jokerit players
Living people
Medalists at the 2014 Winter Olympics
National Hockey League first-round draft picks
National Hockey League All-Stars
Olympic ice hockey players of Sweden
Olympic medalists in ice hockey
Olympic silver medalists for Sweden
Ottawa Senators draft picks
Ottawa Senators players
People from Vetlanda Municipality
San Jose Sharks players
Södertälje SK players
Swedish expatriate ice hockey players in Canada
Swedish expatriate ice hockey players in Finland
Swedish expatriate ice hockey players in the United States
Swedish ice hockey defencemen
Sportspeople from Jönköping County